The 2019 General Aung San Shield Final is the 9th final of the MFF Cup.
The General Aung San Shield winner will qualify to AFC Cup competition. 
The match was contested by Shan United and Yangon United  at Thuwunna Stadium in Yangon. The match will play  on 21 September 2019 and was the final match of the Bogyoke Aung San Cup.

Background
It is Shan United's second times General Aung San Shield final. Last time, they won against Yangon United in 2017 General Aung San Shield.

Yangon United were playing a record 5th MFF Cup final. They had previously won against Hanthawaddy United in 2018 General Aung San Shield final.

Ticket allocation
Both Shan United and Yangon United received a ticket allocation of 10,000 for the game. Ticket prices were Ks.1,000/- (Normal Ticket) and Ks.2,000/- (Special Ticket).

Route to the Final

Shan United

Yangon United

Match

Details

Statistics

Winner

Prizes for winner
 A champion trophy.
 Ks.3,00,00,000/- prize money.

Prizes for runners-up
 Ks.150,00,000/- prize money.

Broadcasting rights

These matches will be broadcast live on Myanmar television:

References

General Aung San Shield
2019 in Burmese football